Totton and Eling is a civil parish in Hampshire, England, with a population of about 29,000 people. It contains the town of Totton and is situated between the eastern edge of the New Forest and the River Test, close to the city of Southampton but outside the city boundary; the town is within the New Forest non-metropolitan district. Surrounding towns and villages include Ashurst, Marchwood, Cadnam and Ower.

Description
Totton claimed to be the largest village in England until it was made a town in 1974. The town is often considered to be made up of several smaller villages, such as Testwood, Calmore and Hammonds Green (as well as the original village of Totton) which have been connected by new clusters of housing to form the town as it is today. This is backed up by the presence of several areas of local shops, which served their respective villages in the past, and to an extent still do today. Until the 1967 forest perambulation fencing, New Forest ponies were free to roam its streets. The town's built up area has swollen significantly since the later half of the 20th century and now forms a near continuous web of development with surrounding villages, with Ower, Netley Marsh and Ashurst in particular having little or no discernible distinction in built up area.

Totton's town centre has changed little since the 1970s. Commercial Road and the A35 causeway are the main exit routes from the town.

The areas behind Calmore Industrial Estate by the River Test have been regenerated with lakes for boating, but their main use is for fishing and as a water supply resource.
There is also the Testwood Lakes Centre, with walks along the Test Way running from Totton to Inkpen Beacon in Berkshire, via Romsey in Hampshire.

Eling can be accessed by crossing the railway line which divides the original old village of Totton and the areas of Eling, and Hounsdown. This goes to Brokenford which has some pathways from Totton to the A35 Bypass road at Eling recreation ground, by Bartley Water. The village's name is pronounced the same as that of the London town and borough of Ealing.

History

Early history
The Iron Age Hillfort at Tatchbury Mount is evidence of early settlement in the Totton area and Netley Marsh on the edge of Totton was the site of an early battle between Anglo Saxon invaders under Cerdic and Romano-Celtic peoples under Natanleod. The construction of Testwood Lakes revealed a treasure-trove of ancient artefacts including one of the oldest known bridges in England, believed to date to around c.1,500BC.

Totton Appears on the "Hantoniae sive Sovthantonensis Comitatvs" map in Joan Blaeu's Atlas Major Vol. 5 Published in 1665 

The area's history is inevitably closely connected with ship and boat building but more with its timber trade. It was the site of much illegal dealing in the timber unlawfully obtained from the New Forest.

Eling's attractions include the parish church and Eling Tide Mill Experience. St Mary's is a Norman church built on Saxon foundations with registers dating back to 1537. The Eling Tide Mill Experience is Eling Tide Mill, its visitor centre, and the outdoor walks around the mill pond at Bartley Water and the Solent Water shoreline at Goatee Beach.  Eling Tide Mill is one of the very few working tide mills in the UK but cannot be equated with the mill listed in the Domesday Book. Hampshire's only surviving medieval toll bridge is here, across Bartley Water by the side of the Tide Mill. This has been in use since at least 1418 and still charges users today. The Eling Tide Mill Experience was closed for refurbishment from 2015 and reopened 9 April 2018.

Recent history
The original village of Totton can be described as the areas of Totton, Testwood and the Salmon Leap, dissected by the A36 and the A336 and bordered by the River Test. From this, many new developments were made to expand the town. The Calmore estate was built in the early 1970s to the north of the town, and subsequent housing has merged the estate to the town as a whole. Extended housing to the Hounsdown region also occurred during the 1970s, with the construction of the school and the increased housing found there. In the late 1980s and 1990s, more housing was built to the west of the town towards Netley Marsh and along Ringwood Road. These developments, collectively referred to as West Totton, consisted of a new communal area and church and hall as well as huge amounts of new homes.

Transport
Totton and Eling is served by the railway at Totton railway station, on the South West Main Line to Southampton, London Waterloo, Bournemouth and Poole, and is run by South Western Railway.

Bus services in the town are run by two main companies. Bluestar operate services to Southampton, Cadnam, Hythe, Dibden and around the town. Wilts & Dorset also operate cross county routes to Salisbury

The town has easy access to the nearby M27 motorway, to Salisbury via the A36 Salisbury Road, to Lyndhurst and Southampton via the A35 and to the Waterside region by the A326.

The town also has numerous cycle routes, which started with the suburban cycleway through West Totton, constructed when the estate was built and running from Hounsdown to Calmore Road. This has further been extended to two on-road routes to the centre of Totton from Calmore schools down Water Lane, and down Salisbury Road. In addition, there are several links to the New Forest cycle network at Ashurst and Foxhills.

Sport
One of the most successful sporting enterprises of the area has been Totton and Eling Cricket Club. Under its former guise of B.A.T. Sports, it won the Southern Premier League, the highest level of club cricket in the Hampshire area, four times in six seasons between 2001 and 2006. In September 2007 Totton and Eling C.C. became North Gear National 2020 Champions beating Ockbrook & Borrowash in the live televised final on Sky Sports.

Totton also has two local football teams, A.F.C. Totton who play at Testwood Stadium and Totton & Eling F.C. who play at Little Testwood Farm. In 2007, AFC Totton made it to the final of the FA Vase and so had the chance to play in the second competitive match at Wembley Stadium. The club were previously based at a ground in the centre of the town, however moved in 2011 to a new stadium with stand and several training pitches near the outskirts of the town in Calmore. The ground reportedly cost £2.5 million.

There is also a rugby club, Tottonians, operating from grounds at Totton College.

Schools
There are two secondary schools and a sixth form college within the parish.
Testwood School is in the north of the town was built in the 1940s, and gained Sports College status in 2004. This resulted in improvement of facilities including building of a synthetic turf pitch and an extension to the sports hall. The Testwood school logo includes the river, the wood and salmon, indicating the nearby River Test and the salmon leap. Testwood hires out its sporting facilities after hours, namely the synthetic turf pitch, which is used frequently by the community. Testwood's pupils mainly come from the central Totton and Calmore areas.

Hounsdown School, a Specialist Science College, built in 1963,opened in 1969
is located in the Hounsdown area of the town, south of the A35. It too has experienced expansion in recent years, including the construction of a new sports hall. The Hounsdown logo is of a stylised, curved triangle. Hounsdown also hires out its sporting facilities after school, namely the swimming pool, which is used frequently by the local community and groups. Hounsdown's catchment area covers Hounsdown village, Eling, West Totton and Ashurst.

The sixth form college, Totton College, opened in 1955 as Totton Grammar School to provide selective education, when grammar schools were phased out it changed status to a 16- 19 yr old FE college. 

Totton has a split site special educational needs school called Forest Park School, which opened in September 2009, which caters for children from Nursery to Post 16. It's an amalgamation of 2 former SEN schools called Forest Edge School, which was located on Lydlynch Road, this is now the site of Forest Park Primary School, which was built around the old school building. The secondary school, called Forest Park Secondary School, was called Salterns school, which is located on Commercial Road. The Primary site has a range of pupils with moderate, severe and profound learning difficulties, whilst the secondary site provides education for children with severe and profound learning difficulties.

Religion
The town has a number of churches in the area, the biggest and oldest being St. Mary the Virgin church in Eling. Other Anglican churches in the town include the church of St. Anne in Calmore, the church of St. Matthew in Netley Marsh and the church of St. Winfrid in Testwood. These churches form the Team parish of Totton and are part of the Diocese of Winchester. In addition to these, there is also Testwood Baptist Church and Trinity Church in West Totton (Methodist/URC).

St. Mary the Virgin Church

St Mary the Virgin is the oldest of the churches in the Totton area. Several years ago during the reordering of the church, part of a Celtic cross dating back to the 9th (possibly the 6th) century was found. The site of St Mary's has been a place of Christian worship since that date. The church building has Saxon origins.

Today the church stands on the hill looking out over the bay to the container port on the Southampton side of Millbrook.

The church has a modern interior with a light, open effect and the traditional stone, including a Saxon arch.

St Mary the Virgin Church is a part of the Anglican team ministry that covers Totton and Eling with 38,000 people within its area. Historically the mother church to the area, St Mary's is now one of four churches in the team ministry along with Calmore, Netley Marsh and Testwood. In 2003 two self-styled 'vampires' were imprisoned for harassment of the vicar of St Mary's and his family.

References

External links

Official Totton & Eling Town Council Website. Accessed 24 November 2007
Totton Local Business & Trade Services Guide

Civil parishes in Hampshire
New Forest District